FC Avirons, is a football (soccer) club from Les Avirons, Réunion Island.

Managers
Arsène Ablancourt (?-2003)
  Fares Bousdira (2004)
 Gerard Di Rollo (2006–07)
 Fabien Schneider (2009–)

Avirons
1957 establishments in Réunion
Association football clubs established in 1957